Hendrik Veen (6 October 1823, Haarlem – 14 March 1905, Haarlem) was a prolific photographer in the Dutch East Indies. He photographed ethnographic shots of locals, landscapes, architecture, landscapes and botanical subjects. His work included a series of photos of the temples in Buleleng.

References

External links
Henrik Veen photographs on Wikipedia Commons

1823 births
1905 deaths
Dutch photographers
Artists from Haarlem
19th-century Dutch East Indies people
20th-century Dutch East Indies people
Photography in the Dutch East Indies